Pelvoux (Vivaro-Alpine: Pelvós) is a former commune in the Hautes-Alpes department in the Provence-Alpes-Côte d'Azur region in southeastern France. On 1 January 2017, it was merged into the new commune Vallouise-Pelvoux.

Pelvoux bid to be the French candidate city for the 2018 Winter Olympics, but the French National Olympic and Sports Committee chose to submit Annecy's bid instead.

Geography

Climate
Pelvoux has a humid continental climate (Köppen climate classification Dfb).

Population

See also
Communes of the Hautes-Alpes department

References

External links
 Pelvoux Description in French and pictures
 Official Olympic bid web site Pelvoux Écrins 2018

Former communes of Hautes-Alpes